Erwin may refer to:

People

Given name
 Erwin Chargaff (1905–2002), Austrian biochemist
 Erwin Chemerinsky (born 1953), American legal scholar
 Erwin Dold (1919–2012), German concentration camp commandant in World War 2
 Erwin Hauer (1926–2017), Austrian-born American sculptor
 Egon Erwin Kisch (1885–1948), Czechoslovak writer and journalist
 Erwin Emata (born 1973), Filipino mountain climber
 Erwin James (born 1957), British writer and journalist
 Erwin Klein (died 1992), American table tennis player
 Erwin Koeman (born 1961), Dutch footballer and coach
 Erwin Kramer (1902–1979), East German politician
 Erwin Kreyszig (1922–2008), American academic
 Erwin Neutzsky-Wulff (born 1949), Danish author and philosopher
 Erwin Osen (1891–1970), Austrian mime artist
 Erwin Panofsky (1892-1968), German-Jewish art historian
 Erwin Ramírez (born 1971), Ecuadorian football player 
 Erwin Rommel (1891–1944), German field marshal of World War II
 Erwin Rösener (1902–1946), German Nazi SS officer executed for war crimes
 Erwin Rosenthal (1904–1991), German-born British Hebrew scholar and orientalist
 Erwin Sánchez (born 1969), Bolivian football (soccer) player and manager
 Erwin Schrödinger (1887–1961), Austrian physicist
 Erwin Schulhoff (1894–1942), Czech composer and pianist
 Erwin Strittmatter (1912–1994), German writer
 Erwin Teufel (born 1939), German politician
 Erwin Tulfo (born 1964), Filipino news anchor and radio commentator
 Erwin Vandenbergh (born 1959), Belgian football player

Surname
 Alec Erwin (born 1948), South African politician 
 Andrew Erwin (born 1978), American film director, screenwriter, producer, part of the Erwin Brothers with his brother Jon
 Austin W. Erwin (1887–1965), American lawyer and politician
 Bill Erwin (1914–2010), American actor 
 Brandon Erwin (born 1975), American racecar driver
 Charles K. Erwin (1837–1905), American businessman and politician
 Douglas Erwin (born 1958), American paleobiologist
 Dudley Erwin (1917–1984), Australian politician
 E. B. Erwin, American politician 
 George Z. Erwin (1840–1894), American politician
 Greg Erwin (born 1970), American crew chief
 Guy Erwin (born 1958), American Lutheran bishop
 Hank Erwin (born 1949), American State Senator in Alabama, USA and a Christian evangelical, father of film directors Andre and Jon Erwin known as the Erwin Brothers 
 Henry E. Erwin (1921–2002), American airman
 Jacques Erwin (1908–1957), French actor 
 James Erwin (politician) (1920–2005), American politician and attorney
 James Erwin (author) (born 1974), American author
 James Brailsford Erwin (1856–1924), American army general
 Jean Erwin (1890–1969), New Zealand civilian and military nurse
 Joe Erwin (born 1956), American entrepreneur and politician
 John Erwin (born 1936), American actor 
 John Patton Erwin (1795–1857), American politician
 Jon Erwin (born 1982), American film director, screenwriter, producer, part of the Erwin Brothers with his brother Andrew
 Judy Erwin (born 1950), American politician, educator, and public relations executive
 Lee Erwin (writer) (1906–1972), American screenwriter 
 Lee Erwin (footballer) (born 1994), Scottish soccer player
 Mark Wylea Erwin (born 1944), American ambassador
 Michael Erwin (born 1965), Australian rules footballer 
 Mick Erwin (born 1943), Australian rules footballer 
 Mike Erwin (born 1978), American actor 
 Pee Wee Erwin (1913–1981), American jazz trumpeter
 Ralph Erwin (1896–1943), Austrian-French composer 
 Richard Erwin (1923–2006), American politician
 Robert Cecil Erwin (1934–2020), American jurist
 Sherri Browning Erwin (born 1968), American novelist
 Steve Erwin (born 1960), American comics artist 
 Stuart Erwin (1903–1967), American actor
 Terry Erwin (1940–2020), American entomologist
 Terry Erwin (American football) (born 1946), American footballer 
 Tex Erwin (1885–1953), American baseball player
 William Erwin (American football) (1884–1953), American footballer 
 William Portwood Erwin (1895–1927), American flying ace

Fictional characters
 Erwin Smith, a character from the manga and anime series Attack on Titan
 Erwin Sikowitz, a character from the Nickelodeon TV show Victorious

Places
 Erwin, Indiana
 Erwin, New York
 Erwin, North Carolina
 Erwin, South Dakota
 Erwin, Tennessee
 Erwin Township, Michigan
 Erwin Lake, a lake in Minnesota

Other
 Erwin (storm)
 Erwin, a character in the comic User Friendly

See also 
 Erwin Data Modeler, CASE tool from Erwin Inc.
 Earvin
 Ervin (disambiguation)
 Ervine
 Erving (disambiguation)
 Erwan
 Irvin
 Irvine (disambiguation)
 Irving (disambiguation)
 Irwin (disambiguation)
 
 

ja:アーウィン